Chunosovsky is a rural locality (a khutor) in Kumylzhenskoye Rural Settlement, Kumylzhensky District, Volgograd Oblast, Russia. The population was 14 in 2010. There are three streets.

Geography 
Chunosovsky is located in forest steppe, on Khopyorsko-Buzulukskaya Plain, on the bank of the Kumylga River, 9 km north of Kumylzhenskaya (the district's administrative centre) by road. Golovsky is the nearest rural locality.

References 

Rural localities in Kumylzhensky District